Sand-e Mir Suiyan Rural District is a rural district (dehestan) in Dashtiari County, Sistan and Baluchestan province, Iran. At the 2006 census, its population was 12,151, in 2,387 families.  The rural district has 25 villages.

References 

Rural Districts of Sistan and Baluchestan Province
Chabahar County